The Chaldean Catholic Patriarchate of Baghdad, or simply the Chaldean Patriarchate, is the official title held by the primate of the Chaldean Catholic Church. The patriarchate is based in the Cathedral of Mary Mother of Sorrows, Baghdad, Iraq.  The current patriarch is Louis Raphaël I Sako. He is assisted by the archbishop of Erbil Shlemon Warduni and the Auxiliary Bishop of Baghdad Basel Yaldo. Its cathedral is the Church of Mary Mother of Sorrows in Baghdad, Iraq.

Chaldean Catholics are the majority of  Assyrians in Iraq, an indigenous people of North Mesopotamia.

Etymology
In 1552, there was a schism within the Church of the East, caused by discontent among the bishops(metropolitans) over actions of the patriarch Shemʿon VII Ishoʿyahb following the tradition of previous patriarch Shemʿon IV Basidi who made the patriarchal succession hereditary, normally from uncle to nephew. Joseph I (1681–1696), who served as the Metropolitan of Amid (modern-day Diyarbakır, Turkey) led the an off-shoot of the Church of the East and joined the Roman Catholic Church. His successor, Joseph II (1696–1713), was officially bestowed with the symbolic title Patriarch of Babylon. Although this patriarchate was established in the city of Diyarbakır, it was eventually moved to the city of Mosul and finally to Baghdad where it remains to this day. The title Patriarch of Babylon or Patriarch of Babylon of the Chaldeans remained in popular usage until the name Babylon was officially abandoned in August, 2021.

See also
 List of Chaldean Catholic Patriarchs of Baghdad
 Chaldean Catholic Church
 Council of Catholic Patriarchs of the East

References

Sources

External links
 Website of the Patriarchate
 GCatholic.org
 Catholic Hierarchy.org entry

 
300s establishments
1552 establishments in the Ottoman Empire
1553 establishments in the Ottoman Empire
1830 establishments in the Ottoman Empire
Babylon
Eastern Catholic dioceses in Asia
Babylon